Kopp's law can refer to either of two relationships discovered by the German chemist Hermann Franz Moritz Kopp (1817–1892).

Kopp found "that the molecular heat capacity of a solid compound is the sum of the atomic heat capacities of the elements composing it; the elements having atomic heat capacities lower than those required by the Dulong–Petit law retain these lower values in their compounds."
In studying organic compounds, Kopp found a regular relationship between boiling points and the number of CH2 groups present.

Kopp–Neumann law 
The Kopp–Neumann law, named for Kopp and Franz Ernst Neumann, is a common approach for determining the specific heat C  (in J·kg−1·K−1) of compounds using the following equation:
 
where N is the total number of compound constituents, and Ci and fi denote the specific heat and mass fraction of the i-th constituent. This law works surprisingly well at room-temperature conditions, but poorly at elevated temperatures.

See also 
 Rule of mixtures

References 
 Frederick Seitz, The Modern Theory of Solids, McGraw-Hill, New York, USA, 1940, ASIN: B000OLCK08

Further reading

Laws of thermodynamics